GS/OS is an operating system developed by Apple Computer for its Apple IIGS personal computer. It provides facilities for accessing the file system, controlling input/output devices, loading and running program files, and a system allowing programs to handle interrupts and signals. It uses ProDOS as its primarily filing system. GS/OS is a component of Apple IIGS System Software versions 4.0 through 6.0.1, and was the first true 16-bit operating system for the IIGS.

Features

Speed optimization
The advantage of GS/OS over its predecessor, the ProDOS 16 operating system, is that it was written entirely in 16-bit code for the 65816 processor used in the IIGS, rather than primarily in 8-bit 6502 machine code that does not take advantage of the IIGS's unique features. This in turn allows GS/OS to offers vast speed optimizations (loading time, disk access, screen updates) compared with the previous OS, and provided room to incorporate many features of other Apple operating systems, including Apple III Apple SOS, the Macintosh System 5, as well as concepts and features that would later appear in future Macintosh System Software releases (e.g. proportional scrollbars, thermometer progress bars).

New features and enhancements
In addition to continued enhancements to the IIGS Finder and loadable fonts, GS/OS offered plug-in device drivers (modem, printer, etc.), a thermometer progress display, AppleShare support, File System Translators for accessing foreign file formats, disk caching and support for storage devices up to 4 Gigabytes. It also extends the ProDOS file system to provide for resource forks on files similar to those used on the Apple Macintosh, which allows for programs to be written in a more flexible way. The newly included Apple Advanced Disk Utilities and Apple IIGS Installer helped facilitate partitioning, formatting and installing software and drivers with visual ease. A command-line development environment called APW (Apple Programmer's Workshop) is available; much like the Macintosh Programmer's Workshop.

File System Translators
GS/OS includes a unique facility known as file system translators (FSTs) which allows it to support multiple on-disk file systems in a manner transparent to application programs, a feature not found in ProDOS or most other microcomputer operating systems at the time. It was usually used with the ProDOS file system (which was the only one from which it could be booted), but GS/OS also supports a variety of other file systems, including the Hierarchical File System used by the Mac OS. Other file system translators, in addition to ProDOS and HFS, include those for MS-DOS, High Sierra/ISO-9660, Apple DOS 3.3, and Pascal, albeit read-only (full read/write support had been planned but never completed).

Releases
Source:

ProDOS 16 (GS/OS predecessor)
1986 – System 1.0 (ProDOS 16 v1.0), System 1.1 (ProDOS 16 v1.1)
1987 – System 2.0 (ProDOS 16 v1.2), System 3.1 (ProDOS 16 v1.3)
1988 – System 3.2 (ProDOS 16 v1.6)

GS/OS
1988 – System 4.0 (GS/OS v2.0)
1989 – System 5.0 (GS/OS v3.0), System 5.0.1 (GS/OS v3.0), System 5.0.2 (GS/OS v3.0)
1990 – System 5.0.3 (GS/OS v3.03)
1991 – System 5.0.4 (GS/OS v3.03)
1992 – System 6.0 (GS/OS v4.01) 
1993 – System 6.0.1 (GS/OS v4.02)

Unofficial versions
2015 – System 6.0.2 (GS/OS v4.02), System 6.0.3 (GS/OS v4.02)
2017 – System 6.0.4 (GS/OS v4.02)

See also 
 Apple DOS
 Apple II
 Apple IIGS
 Juiced.GS – The last remaining Apple II publication
 KansasFest – An annual convention for Apple II users
 Macintosh Finder
 ProDOS

References

External links 
 Apple IIgs GS/OS 6.0.1 Screenshots and details
 GS/OS at the Apple II History Museum
 A2Central.com  – Apple II news and downloads

Apple II software
Apple Inc. operating systems
Disk operating systems
Discontinued operating systems
Window-based operating systems